Gatwala Wildlife Park is a wildlife park, botanical garden and breeding center located in the town of Gatwala in Faisalabad, Punjab, Pakistan.

It is the largest park of Faisalabad. Gatwala Forest Park is a huge compound of more than 100 km2 that houses forest areas, parks, lakes and administrative buildings of the Ministry of Forestry, Government of Pakistan. Situated on the Shiekhupura Road / Lahore Road, its distance from the Clock Tower, Faisalabad is almost 20 km. It is situated next to many residential colonies and towns of Metropolis of Faisalabad as a result of the extreme expansion of residential areas of Faisalabad.

The main attractions in Gatwala Park are the huge green parks that house a few rides for children, flowing canals across the park, bamboo growing area, large forest areas and two lakes. Boating is done in one lake, whereas the other lake is the home to many crocodiles. Proper cordoning of the lake with crocodiles has created a safe area for people to view crocodiles from a distance.

History
The land where Gatwala Wildlife Park is situated belonged to Punjab Forestry Department. In 1985, the then government of Pakistan, declared Faisalabad a division and announced many upgrade projects. One of these projects was the development of a Wildlife Park in Gatwala. The overall development took 7 years and wildlife park was completed with all its facilities in 1992.

Facilities 
Gatwala Wildlife Park is equipped with many facilities to make the visit enjoyable yet close to nature. The following recreational activities are available in Gatwala Wildlife Forest Park Faisalabad.

Main Lake
This lake lies at the northwest end of Gatwala Wildlife Park and is a good example of natural lake. The lake exhibits moss and tulip flowers and it is also possible to take an oar boat ride.

Children Area
The main attraction for children is the area in the center of the park that houses many rides, however, in order to maintain aura of natural wildlife, no mechanized ride is installed.

Bamboo Forest
In the east end of Gatwala Wildlife Park lies the Bamboo Forest area next to a flowing stream. It is a major attraction especially in the summer months because of its thick and cold shadows.

Bird Sanctuary
A large sized bird sanctuary lies on the northeast part of Gatwala Wildlife Park. This sanctuary houses many local birds species as well as a few from other regions of Pakistan.

Crocodile Farm
In the north end of Gatwala Wildlife Park visitors can visit a crocodile farm which is the home to many crocodiles and alligators.

Open Parks
The south end of Gatwala Wildlife Park is a big open ground decorated with many flowers and rare trees. This area is of major attraction for families to come for picnics or to enjoy sun in winter months.

See also 
 List of zoos in Pakistan
 List of botanical gardens in Pakistan
  Lashari wala Forest

References 

Faisalabad
Zoos in Pakistan
Articles needing infobox zoo
Tourist attractions in Faisalabad